The men's field hockey tournament at the 1956 Summer Olympics was the eighth edition of the field hockey event for men at the Summer Olympics. It was contested from 23 November to 6 December, with twelve participating teams.  Only men competed in field hockey at these Games.

India won the gold medal for the sixth successive Games, not allowing a single goal against in the entire tournament.  Pakistan won the silver medal, and Germany won the bronze.

Medalists

Participating nations
Twelve teams were seeded and placed into one of three preliminary groups of four teams each. With the unbalanced seeding, the top two teams in Group C advanced to the semi-finals, but only the top team in both Groups A and B advanced.

Group A
 
  
 
 

Group B
  
  
 
 

Group C

Squads

Results

Preliminary round

Pool A

Pool B

Play–off match

Pool C

Classification round

Ninth to twelfth place classification

Fifth to eighth place classification

Medal round

Bracket

Semi-finals

Bronze medal match

Gold medal match

Final standings

References

External links
 
 

 
Field hockey at the Summer Olympics
1956 Summer Olympics events
1956 Summer Olympics
Summer Olympics